Edith Lagos was a Peruvian insurgent who was a member of the party Shining Path, one of the multiple  Communist Parties of Peru.  Lagos was a prominent promoter of the group's agenda.

Lagos was born in Ayacucho to a wealthy family. She studied law at Universidad de San Martín de Porres in Lima before dropping out to join Shining Path

In 1980, Lagos escaped the Ayacucho jail after a Shining Path detachment blew a hole in the jail wall.  She spent the next two years promoting Shining Path and participating in their operations.

In 1982, Lagos was killed in Umaca, Peru, in a shootout with police and paramilitary forces.  She was buried in Ayacucho. It was estimated that up to 30,000 people attended the funeral. Lago's tomb was later bombed by the Rodrigo Franco Command.

References

1962 births
1982 deaths
Anti-revisionists
Peruvian guerrillas killed in action
Peruvian communists
Peruvian revolutionaries
Members of the Shining Path
Women in war in South America
Women in warfare post-1945